A Woman's Tale is a 1991 Australian film directed by Paul Cox and starring Sheila Florance, Gosia Dobrowolska, Norman Kaye, Chris Haywood, Max Gillies and Ernie Gray.

Premise
Martha (Florance) is an elderly woman living alone in her flat and dying of cancer.  Her love of life leads to an ambivalence about her age; her unique moral code leads to her playing cupid for her friend and nurse Anna (Dobrowolska) and Anna's married lover (Gray); her worrisome son (Haywood) wants her to move into a home; her neighbour Billy (Kaye) has dementia.

Production
Florance herself was dying of cancer as the film was being shot. She died aged 75, nine days after being awarded the 1991 Australian Film Institute Award for Best Actress in a Leading Role.

Box office
A Woman's Tale grossed $49,584 at the box office in Australia.
The film grossed $405,137 in the United States.

Reception
Roger Ebert added A Woman's Tale to his Great Movies list in 2004.

References

External links 
 
 
A Woman's Tale at the Australian screen
A Woman's Tale at Oz Movies

1991 films
Australian independent films
Australian drama films
Films directed by Paul Cox
1991 drama films
1991 independent films
1990s English-language films
1990s Australian films